Rhiarna Ferris (born 27 June 1992) is a New Zealand rugby player. She played for the Black Ferns Sevens team internationally and competes for Hurricanes Poua in the Super Rugby Aupiki competition.

Biography 
Ferris attended Taradale High School for three years before going to Tū Toa in Palmerston North for her final two years. She played netball for the Central Zone and for Western Flyers.

Ferris made her international debut for the Black Ferns Sevens at the Fast Four tournament in Hamilton in 2019. She later made her official series debut at the Japan Sevens.

In 2020, She played for the New Zealand Warriors in the NRL Nines in Perth. In 2022, she was named in the Hurricanes Poua team to face the Chiefs in their first official Super Rugby Aupiki match.

References

External links 

 Black Ferns Profile

1992 births
Living people
New Zealand female rugby union players
New Zealand female rugby sevens players
New Zealand female rugby league players
New Zealand women's international rugby sevens players
New Zealand netball players
National Netball League (New Zealand) players
Central Manawa players